The Little Falling River is a river in the United States state of Virginia.

See also
List of rivers of Virginia

References

USGS Geographic Names Information Service
USGS Hydrologic Unit Map - State of Virginia (1974)

Rivers of Virginia
Tributaries of the Roanoke River